Hwang Bo-ra (born October 2, 1983) is a South Korean actress. Hwang made her acting debut in 2003 and became popular after she played a quirky-looking "cup noodle girl" in a ramyeon commercial. In 2007, Hwang played the daughter/narrator in black comedy Skeletons in the Closet (also known as Shim's Family), for which she won Best New Actress at the Busan Film Critics Awards and Director's Cut Awards.

This was followed by supporting roles in films and television dramas such as Arang and the Magistrate (2012), The Eldest (2013), and Cunning Single Lady (2014). Hwang has also played leading roles in ghost romance Jumunjin (2010; which reunited her with Rainbow Romance co-star Kim Kibum), revenge drama Dangerous Woman (2011), and horror movie Navigation (2014).

Personal life 
On July 6, 2022, Hwang revealed that she will be marrying , CEO of her management agency Walk House Company whom she had been dating for 10 years, on November 6, 2022, in a private wedding ceremony in Seoul. Kim is also an actor and singer-turned-film producer better known as Cha Hyun-woo and is the younger brother of actor Ha Jung-woo and the second son of actor Kim Yong-gun.

Hwang appeared as a special MC in SBS Same Bed, Different Dreams 2 and stated that the couple had already registered their marriage and were a legal couple in March 2022.

Filmography

Film

Television series

Web series

Television shows

Music video

Theater

Awards and nominations

References

External links 
 
 
 

1983 births
Living people
21st-century South Korean actresses
South Korean television actresses
South Korean film actresses
South Korean stage actresses
Actresses from Busan
Dongguk University alumni